Fiji Link is the trade name for Fiji Airlines Limited, which is a Fijian domestic airline and a wholly owned subsidiary of the international carrier Fiji Airways. It is headquartered at the Fiji Link office in the Civil Aviation Authority of Fiji (CAAFI) compound at Nadi International Airport in Nadi. It operates scheduled services to 11 destinations within the Fijian Islands as well as regionally within the Pacific Islands.  The company slogan is Best value under the Sun.

History

Don Collingwood, a pilot and businessman, founded what became Pacific Sun in 1980, under the name Sunflower Airlines, which later changed to Sun Air. It began with a single Britten Norman BN2 Islander aircraft, flying the Nadi-Taveuni route. Other than the BN2 Islanders which remained the backbone of the fleet, the airline operated a wide range of piston and turboprop aircraft including the Beechcraft BE-95 Baron, Beechcraft A65 Queen Air, de Havilland DH.114 Heron, Shorts 330, and de Havilland DHC-6 Twin Otter. By January 2007 before official handover to Air Pacific, its fleet had grown to 12 aircraft, and the company employed nearly 140 staff.

On 31 January 2007, Sun Air was sold and handed over to current parent company Fiji Airways, formerly Air Pacific, which had to fight off a legal challenge against the handover by the now-defunct rival domestic carrier at the time, Air Fiji. Air Pacific then established the domestic airline as Fiji Airlines Limited, trading as Pacific Sun. The airline began operations with eight aircraft, including the introduction of two  ATR 42–500 aircraft purchased used from Air Mauritius, along with three existing BN2 Islanders and three DHC-6 Twin Otters. However, the fleet was cut back to just four between December 2010 and June 2011 due to economic cost cutting, resulting in the withdrawal of the BN2 Islander fleet as well as one DHC-6 Twin Otter. Two additional leased DHC-6 Twin Otters were added to the fleet during June 2011 to increase the Pacific Sun fleet to six aircraft.

On 26 November 2013, parent Fiji Airways announced Pacific Sun was to be rebranded as ‘Fiji Link’. Operations as Fiji Link commenced in June 2014.

News
In late November 2010, Pacific Sun announced that due to current economical reasons, they were withdrawing their BN2 Islander fleet from service. This meant downsizing the Pacific Sun fleet from eight aircraft to just five.

In early December 2010, Pacific Sun announced the redundancy of 85 out of 210 employees. This included staff from administrative, support and operations areas as well as 15 pilots. Pacific Sun's general manager, Jim Samson, explained that continuing operating losses had resulted in management having to make some tough decisions.

"Pacific Sun has lost, on average, $6 million per year over the last three years. Continued losses are unsustainable. Regrettably as a result, we have no alternative but to restructure the airline in order to ensure its viability and success going forward," he said.

Air Pacific chief executive officer and Pacific Sun board member David Pflieger said since Air Pacific's takeover in 2007, Pacific Sun had accumulated $18.5 million in losses. Air Pacific had loaned $44 million to purchase Sun Air's certificate and operations and two ATR-42 aircraft.

In November 2013, Fiji Airways held a competition to rename Pacific Sun. On 13 November, the competition closed with the most votes going to Fiji Link. On 26 November, Fiji Airways released the new name. The new livery was also announced. Operations as Fiji Link commenced in June 2014.

Destinations
As of August 2022, Fiji Link operates scheduled services to the following 11 domestic destinations.

Fiji
Cicia – Cicia Airport
Kadavu – Kadavu Airport
Koro - Koro Airport
Labasa – Labasa Airport
Lakeba – Lakeba Airport
Nadi – Nadi International Airport – main hub
Rotuma – Rotuma Airport
Savusavu – Savusavu Airport
Suva – Nausori International Airport – secondary hub
Taveuni – Matei Airport
Vanua Balavu – Vanuabalavu Airport

Other International Flights
Funafuti – Funafuti International Airport
Neiafu – Vava'u International Airport

Terminated destinations
Fiji
Laucala - Laucala Airport
Malolo Lailai - Malolo Lailai Airport
Mana Island - Mana Island Airport
Taveuni - Ura Airport
Yasawa-i-Rara - Yasawa Island Airport

Fleet
The Fiji Link fleet consists (as of February 2020) of the following aircraft listed in the table below.

References

External links

Fiji Airways and Pacific Sun

Airlines of Fiji
Airlines established in 2006
2006 establishments in Oceania